Inatio Akaruru  (31 March 1937 – 31 January 2014) was a Cook Islands politician, cabinet minister and Deputy Prime Minister. He was a member of the Cook Islands Party.

Akaruru was born on Pukapuka. He worked as a public servant before being elected as MP for Pukapuka at the 1968 election. He served as a Cabinet Minister in the government of Albert Henry and as Deputy Prime Minister to Geoffrey Henry.

At the 1999 election Akaruru held the Pukapuka-Nassau seat by a single vote. The result was challenged by the Democratic Alliance Party and declared invalid. A by-election in September 1999 was also subsequently invalidated. Akaruru contested the resulting 2000 Pukapuka-Nassau by-election and was defeated.

In 1977, Akaruru was awarded the Queen Elizabeth II Silver Jubilee Medal. He was appointed a Commander of the Order of the British Empire in the 1992 New Year Honours.

Akaruru was interested in bowls and was President of the Cook Islands Bowling Association from 1984 to 2006. He represented the Cook Islands in Bowls at the 1990 Auckland and 2002 Manchester Commonwealth Games.

References

1937 births
2014 deaths
Deputy Prime Ministers of the Cook Islands
Members of the Parliament of the Cook Islands
Cook Islands Party politicians
Cook Island male bowls players
People from Pukapuka
Cook Island Commanders of the Order of the British Empire
Bowls players at the 1990 Commonwealth Games
Bowls players at the 2002 Commonwealth Games
Commonwealth Games competitors for the Cook Islands